Nicola Princivalli (born 29 September 1979) is an Italian football coach and a former player. He is the head coach of Cjarlins Muzane.

Biography
He made his Serie B debut in a 3–1 win over Vicenza, on 13 October 2002.

In July 2006 he joined Foggia.

In 2010–11 season he was putted to transfer window but failed to agree any transfer. In January 2011 the swap deal with Vincenzo Pepe was collapsed in January 2011. Eventually Princivalli did not play any game in 2010–11 Serie B. After the team relegated, Princivalli re-entered the squad.

In October 2012 he joined Venezia.

Coaching career
On 23 September 2019, he was appointed caretaker head coach of Triestina. He was replaced by Carmine Gautieri on 14 October 2019 after 4 games with 2 wins and 2 losses.

On 27 January 2021, he was hired by Serie D club Cjarlins Muzane.

References

External links
 

1979 births
Footballers from Trieste
Living people
Italian footballers
Association football midfielders
U.S. Triestina Calcio 1918 players
A.C.R. Messina players
U.S. Salernitana 1919 players
Calcio Foggia 1920 players
Venezia F.C. players
A.C. Ancona players
Serie B players
Serie C players
Serie D players
Italian football managers
U.S. Triestina Calcio 1918 managers
Serie C managers